Scobey Airport  is a public airport located one mile (2 km) northwest of the central business district of Scobey, a city in Daniels County, Montana, United States. It is owned by the City of Scobey and Daniels County.

Facilities and aircraft 
For the 12-month period ending July 25, 2006, the airport had 4,450 aircraft operations, an average of 12 per day: 91% general aviation and 9% air taxi.

References

External links 

Airports in Montana
Buildings and structures in Daniels County, Montana
Transportation in Daniels County, Montana